The following television stations in the United States brand as channel 10 (though neither using virtual channel 10 nor broadcasting on physical RF channel 10):
 KFOL-CD in Houma, Louisiana
 WABG-DT2 in Greenwood, Mississippi
 WBTS-CD in Nashua, New Hampshire
 WCJB-DT2 in Gainesville, Florida
 WLNY-TV in Riverhead, New York
 WRXY-TV in Tice, Florida
 WTVY-DT3 in Dothan, Alabama
 WUPA in Atlanta, Georgia
 WVVA-DT2 in Bluefield, West Virginia

10 branded